Kagarmanovo (Qaharman) is a rural locality (a village) in Uzyansky Selsoviet, Beloretsky District, Bashkortostan, Russia. The population was 432 as of 2010. There are 13 streets.

Geography 
Kagarmanovo is located 62 km southwest of Beloretsk (the district's administrative centre) by road. Uzyan is the nearest rural locality.

References 

Rural localities in Beloretsky District